A/an herb is a plant used for flavoring or medicine.

Herb or Herbs may also refer to:

People
 Herb (given name), a personal name, usually a short form of Herbert
 Herb (surname), a family name

Arts, entertainment, and media
 Herb (film), a 2007 South Korean film
 Herbs (band), a New Zealand reggae group
 The Herbs, a television show

Other uses
 Herbaceous plant, a plant that lacks a woody stem
 Herb (company), an American cannabis advocacy company
 Herb, a slang term for marijuana
 Herb, in Polish heraldry, a coat of arms
 Typhoon Herb, the strongest and the largest storm of 1996

See also 
 Herbert (disambiguation)
 Herbie (disambiguation)